The 2002 Polish Speedway season was the 2002 season of motorcycle speedway in Poland.

Individual

Polish Individual Speedway Championship
The 2002 Individual Speedway Polish Championship final was held on 15 August at Toruń.

Golden Helmet
The 2002 Golden Golden Helmet organised by the Polish Motor Union (PZM) was the 2002 event for the league's leading riders. The final was held on the 12 October at Bydgoszcz.

Junior Championship
 winner - Artur Bogińczuk

Silver Helmet
 winner - Krzysztof Kasprzak

Bronze Helmet
 winner - Robert Umiński

Pairs

Polish Pairs Speedway Championship
The 2002 Polish Pairs Speedway Championship was the 2002 edition of the Polish Pairs Speedway Championship. The final was held on 28 June at Wrocław.

Team

Team Speedway Polish Championship
The 2002 Team Speedway Polish Championship was the 2002 edition of the Team Polish Championship. Polonia Bydgoszcz won the gold medal.

Ekstraliga

1.Liga

2.Liga

Promotion/relegation play offs
Gniezno - Gdańsk 49–41, 35-48
Warszawa - Opole 62–26, 38-52

References

Poland Individual
Poland Team
Speedway
2002 in Polish speedway